The Balintang Channel is the small waterway that separates the Batanes and Babuyan Islands, both of which belong to the Philippines, in the Luzon Strait.

Notable events

1944 incident
During July 1944, the Imperial Japanese Navy cargo submarine I-29 was torpedoed and sunk in this channel by American Navy submarine .

2013 shooting incident
The 2013 Guang Da Xing No. 28 incident, also known as the Balintang Channel incident, was a fatal shooting incident that occurred on 9 May 2013 involving the Taiwanese fishing boat Guang Da Xing No. 28 and the Philippine Coast Guard (PCG) patrol boat Maritime Control Surveillance 3001, which led to the death of Taiwanese fisherman Hung Shih-cheng (洪石成) by gunfire from the Philippine vessel. The Philippines' National Bureau of Investigation recommended that homicide be charged against the eight PCG personnel.

References

Straits of the Philippines